This page is containing records and statistics of Croatian football club GNK Dinamo Zagreb. It shows club records as well as individual records achieved by the clubs players.

Domestic and international titles
Number in parenthesis indicates number of titles, while competition in bold indicates record number of titles.

Croatian First Football League (23): 1993, 1996, 1997, 1998, 1999, 2000, 2003, 2006, 2007, 2008, 2009, 2010, 2011, 2012, 2013, 2014, 2015, 2016, 2018, 2019, 2020, 2021, 2022 
Croatian Football Cup (16): 1994, 1996, 1997, 1998, 2001, 2002, 2004, 2007, 2008, 2009, 2011, 2012, 2015, 2016, 2018, 2021 
Croatian Football Super Cup (7): 2002, 2003, 2006, 2010, 2013, 2019, 2022

Yugoslav First League (10): 1923, 1926, 1928, 1937, 1940, 1943, 1948, 1954, 1958, 1982 
Yugoslav Cup (7): 1951, 1960, 1963, 1965, 1969, 1980, 1983

Inter-Cities Fairs Cup (1): 1967

Reference:

Results and sequences
Record of biggest wins and loses in domestic league, domestic cup and official European matches (from 1992).

Biggest league win: 10–1 vs NK Pazinka, 12 December 1993
Biggest cup win: 13–0 vs NK Rudeš, 7 October 1992, round of 32
Biggest European win: 6–0 vs  B68 Toftir, 1 September 1993, (UEFA Champions League) preliminary round; 6–0 vs  Zalaegerszegi TE, 19 September 2002, (UEFA Cup) 1st round
Biggest league defeat: 0–4 vs NK Varteks, 26 May 1992; 0–4 vs NK Varteks, 19 November 2000
Biggest cup defeat: 1–4 vs Hajduk Split, 19 May 1993, final
Biggest European defeat: 1–7 vs  Olympique Lyonnais, 7 December 2011, (UEFA Champions League) group stage

Record of longest league sequences in terms of winning, losing, scoring and conceding (from 1992).
Most games won in a row: 28 - from 8 November 2006 to 15 September 2007
Most games without defeat: 50 - from 17 May 2014 to 16 October 2015
Most games without winning: 6 - from 10 October 2001 to 4 November 2001
Most games lost in a row: 3 - form 4 October 2001 to 21 October 2001
Most games scored in a row: 61 - from 22 April 2006 to 15 March 2008
Most games without conceding: 10 - from 2 March 2013 to 11 May 2013
Most games without scoring: 4 - from 9 April 2005 to 30 April 2005
Most games conceded in a row: 13 - from 12 March 1995 to 4 June 1995

Reference:

Appearances and goals
GNK Dinamo Zagreb record players in terms of appearances and goals in official matches (domestic league and cup games, all official European games). 
 Last game updated: Rijeka - Dinamo 2–7 (13 November 2022)

Appearances

Goals

Minutes without conceding in league

Updated on 21 August 2022

Reference:

Transfers 

Reference:

Dinamo Zagreb players on major international tournaments

Lists below show Dinamo Zagreb players who represented their countries on major senior continental and world competitions. All players were on the squad list of their national team and under contract as Dinamo Zagreb players at the time. Flag in front of the name indicates national team that the player has represented. Gold, silver and bronze icon after the players name indicates medal won with the nation in question.

1948 Olympics
  Zvonimir Cimermančić 
  Željko Čajkovski 
  Ivan Jazbinšek 
  Ratko Kacijan 
  Franjo Wölfl 
1952 Olympics
  Tomislav Crnković 
  Ivica Horvat 
1956 Olympics
  Mladen Koščak 
  Luka Lipošinović 
1960 Olympics
  Željko Matuš 
  Željko Perušić 
1964 Olympics
  Rudolf Belin
  Zlatko Škorić
  Slaven Zambata
1980 Olympics
  Tomislav Ivković
1984 Olympics
  Borislav Cvetković 
  Stjepan Deverić 
1996 Olympics
  Mark Viduka

1950 FIFA World Cup 
  Željko Čajkovski
  Ivica Horvat
1954 FIFA World Cup
  Tomislav Crnković
  Dionizije Dvornić
  Ivica Horvat
  Branko Kralj
  Lav Mantula
1958 FIFA World Cup
  Tomislav Crnković
  Gordan Irović
  Dražan Jerković
  Luka Lipošinović
  Ivan Šantek
1962 FIFA World Cup
  Dražan Jerković
  Vlatko Marković
  Željko Matuš
  Mirko Stojanović
1982 FIFA World Cup
  Stjepan Deverić
  Velimir Zajec
1990 FIFA World Cup
  Andrej Panadić
  Davor Šuker
1998 FIFA World Cup
  Krunoslav Jurčić 
  Goran Jurić 
  Dražen Ladić 
  Silvio Marić 
  Robert Prosinečki 
  Dario Šimić 
2002 FIFA World Cup
  Tomislav Butina
2006 FIFA World Cup
  Ivan Bošnjak
  Luka Modrić
2014 FIFA World Cup
  El Arbi Hillel Soudani
  Marcelo Brozović
2018 FIFA World Cup
  Dominik Livaković 
  Mario Gavranović
2022 FIFA World Cup
  Dominik Livaković 
  Mislav Oršić 
  Bruno Petković 
  Josip Šutalo 
  Sadegh Moharrami

1997 FIFA Confederations Cup
  Mark Viduka 

UEFA Euro 1960
  Tomislav Crnković 
  Dražan Jerković 
  Željko Matuš 
  Željko Perušić 
UEFA Euro 1968
  Rudolf Belin 
  Mladen Ramljak 
UEFA Euro 1984
  Borislav Cvetković
  Stjepan Deverić
  Velimir Zajec
UEFA Euro 1996
  Igor Cvitanović
  Dražen Ladić
  Zvonimir Soldo
  Dario Šimić
UEFA Euro 2000
  Zoran Pavlovič
UEFA Euro 2008
  Luka Modrić
  Ognjen Vukojević
UEFA Euro 2012
  Milan Badelj
  Ivan Kelava
  Josip Šimunić
  Domagoj Vida
  Šime Vrsaljko
UEFA Euro 2016
  Ante Ćorić
  Marko Pjaca
  Marko Rog
  Gordon Schildenfeld
  Eduardo 
  Alexandru Mățel
UEFA Euro 2020
  Joško Gvardiol
  Luka Ivanušec
  Dominik Livaković
  Mislav Oršić
  Bruno Petković
  Arijan Ademi
  Stefan Ristovski
  Mario Gavranović

1993 CONCACAF Gold Cup
  Nick Dasovic

2015 Africa Cup of Nations
  El Arbi Hillel Soudani
2017 Africa Cup of Nations
  El Arbi Hillel Soudani

2015 Copa América
  Ángelo Henríquez

See also
List of GNK Dinamo Zagreb seasons
GNK Dinamo Zagreb Academy
GNK Dinamo Zagreb in European football

References

Croatian_football_club_statistics
GNK_Dinamo_Zagreb